The plain-crowned spinetail (Synallaxis gujanensis) is a species of bird in the ovenbird family Furnariidae. It is found in Bolivia, Brazil, Colombia, Ecuador, French Guiana, Guyana, Paraguay, Peru, Suriname, and Venezuela. Its natural habitats are subtropical or tropical moist lowland forests and heavily degraded former forest.

Taxonomy
The plain-crowned spinetail was formally described in 1789 by the German naturalist Johann Friedrich Gmelin in his revised and expanded edition of Carl Linnaeus's Systema Naturae. He placed it with the wagtails in the genus Motacilla and coined the binomial name Motacilla gujanensis. Gmelin based his description on "Le rouge-queue de la Guyanne" that had been described and illustrated in 1778 by the French polymath, the Comte de Buffon. The specific epithet gujanensis is from the type locality, the Guianas. The plain-crowned spinetail is now one of 36 spinetails placed in the genus Synallaxis that was introduced in 1818 by Louis Jean Pierre Vieillot.

Six subspecies are recognised:
 S. g. columbiana Chapman, 1914 – east Colombia
 S. g. gujanensis (Gmelin, JF, 1789) – east, south Venezuela through the Guianas to north, east Brazil
 S. g. huallagae Cory, 1919 – southeast Colombia and east Ecuador through east Peru to north Bolivia
 S. g. canipileus Chapman, 1923 – southeast Peru
 S. g. inornata Pelzeln, 1856 – northeast Bolivia and central west Brazil
 S. g. certhiola Todd, 1916 – east Bolivia

References

plain-crowned spinetail
Birds of the Amazon Basin
Birds of the Guianas
plain-crowned spinetail
plain-crowned spinetail
Birds of Brazil
Taxonomy articles created by Polbot